Víctor Adrián Fagundez Samurio (born 5 February 1983 in Montevideo) is an Uruguayan footballer playing for Deportivo Malacateco in Guatemala's top division.

External links
 Player profile 
 

1983 births
Living people
Uruguayan footballers
Association football midfielders
Montevideo Wanderers F.C. players
Expatriate footballers in Guatemala
C.D. Malacateco players